Halvmånesundet is a strait between Halvmåneøya and Edgeøya, Svalbard. It is located east of the peninsula with the headland Negerpynten. The strait has a width of about 1.8 nautical miles at the narrowest point.

References

Straits of Svalbard